The Battle of Poti was a series of skirmishes around Poti, Georgia during the Georgian Civil War, between rebels supporting the former Georgian president Zviad Gamsakhurdia, the so-called 'Zviadists', and Russian forces supporting the Georgian president Eduard Shevardnadze. A group of Russian Marines of the Black Sea Fleet landed in the Georgian port city in late October 1993 to protect an important railway between Poti and the Georgian capital Tbilisi. In November clashes between the Russians and the Zviadists erupted, with the Russian Major General Boris Djukov, claiming no Russian casualties. The fighting ended when the Georgian Armed Forces broke through the rebels' defenses and entered their capital Zugdidi on the 6th of November.

Background

1991–1992 Georgian coup d'état 

In December 1991, a group of former politicians and leaders of paramilitary groups staged a coup against Georgia's first president Zviad Gamsakhurdia, who had become unpopular among Georgians for his authoritarian regime. This conflict, known as the Tbilisi War, would eventually lead to the president fleeing the country in early 1992 and a new government, the Military Council, taking over. This council was replaced by the State Council led by the new president Eduard Shevardnadze two months later.

Separatist movements 
Just like the previous president, Shevardnadze faced an uprising of the Abkhazian and Ossetian minorities. In 1992 the Russians brokered peace between the Georgian government and the break-away republic of South Ossetia, ending the 1991–1992 South Ossetia War. Still, the republic of Abkhazia waged war against Shevardnadze, which caused more instability in Georgia.
Gamsakhurdia's supporters used this distraction to quickly gain ground in his native region, Samegrelo. Subsequentially, the former president would return from exile in September 1993, where he would lead the Zviadists from the city of Zugdidi.

Georgian-Russian Relations 
Following these uprisings, president Shevardnadze decided to ask Russian president Boris Yeltsin to aid him in this conflict. He also joined the Russian-led Commonwealth of Independent States, an alliance made up of former Soviet states. The following months saw Russia supply weapons and technical assistance to Georgia, and Russian soldiers were preparing themselves to secure important Georgian supply routes. Despite this, the Russian military kept claiming neutrality.

Battle

Deployment of Russian Forces 
In late October 1993, the Russian support turned the tide of the civil war. That same month, Russian Naval Infantry landed in the port city of Poti. They were supported by the Black Sea Fleet. Control of this flotilla was disputed, as the recently independent nation of Ukraine claimed ownership, because the home base of this fleet, Sevastopol, is on Ukrainian soil.
Despite this, the Russians launched their intervention from this fleet, of which multiple ships would later patrol the waters off the Georgian coast. The Naval Infantry secured the railway linking Poti and Tbilisi.

Skirmishes and Georgian breakthrough 
On Sunday 31 October, fighting broke out between the two parties. According to Maj. Gen. Boris Djukov, Russian forces were attacked in two places in western Georgia and subsequently returned fire on the rebels. Some days later, on Wednesday 2 November, the Zviadist attacked again and suffered unknown casualties, against no casualties on the Russian side. In the meantime, Shevardnadze's forces captured the vital logistics hub of Senaki. On the 4th of November, 9 Russian warships were deployed to protect other Georgian ports, with plans to plant more Russian military personnel in these cities. This group was led by Admiral Eduard Baltin.
That same day, Georgian forces broke through the rebels' defensive lines and two days later entered Zugdidi. Gamsakhurdia fled, and was later found dead. Whether he committed suicide or was assassinated is unknown. After the Zviadist resistance broke, the Georgian Civil War ended.

See also 
 Georgian Civil War
 1991–1992 Georgian coup d'état
 Russo-Georgian War
 Occupation of Poti

References 

1993 in Georgia (country)